Aitkenhead Glacier is a  long glacier flowing east-southeast from the Detroit Plateau, Graham Land, (south of Mancho Buttress and Baley Nunatak and north of Simpson Nunatak and Hitar Petar Nunatak) into Prince Gustav Channel (close north of Alectoria Island). It was mapped from surveys by the Falkland Islands Dependencies Survey (FIDS) (1960–61), and named by the United Kingdom Antarctic Place-Names Committee for Neil Aitkenhead, a FIDS geologist at Hope Bay (1959–60).

See also
 List of glaciers in the Antarctic

Map
 Trinity Peninsula. Scale 1:250000 topographic map No. 5697. Institut für Angewandte Geodäsie and British Antarctic Survey, 1996.

References
 SCAR Composite Antarctic Gazetteer.
 

Glaciers of Trinity Peninsula